Castine Harbor and Town is an 1851 oil painting on canvas by Fitz Henry Lane.

References

1851 paintings
Paintings in the collection of the Timken Museum of Art